Lithuanian Railways, abbreviated LTG, is the national state-owned railway company of Lithuania. It operates most of the railway network in the country.

During 2021, Lithuanian Railways transported 4.13 million passengers and 51.1 million tonnes of freight; the majority of freight conveyed comprised oil products and fertilizers.

History and structure 

During 1991, Lietuvos Geležinkeliai was established to operate the newly-independent nation's railways. It provides numerous rail-related services, typically through its numerous subsidiary companies. While LTG Link is the provider for passenger services, while LTG Cargo is responsible for freight operations. Furthermore, another subsidiary, LTG Infra undertakes the maintenance and development of the railway infrastructure.

During October 2008, in response to the Polish oil company PKN Orlen plans to reroute freight from its Lithuanian refinery at Mažeikiai to the Latvian port of Ventspils, the Lithuanian Railways unilaterally and intentionally dismantled the cross-border line to Latvia to prevent this. In 2017, the European Commission (EC) issued a €27.87 million fine to the Lithuanian Railways for breaching European Union (EU) competition law by the track's removal. On 15 February 2020, the cross-border line was restored at a cost of €9.4m with the aim of restoring freight services.

In May 2017, Lithuanian Railways was one of several companies that facilitated the launch of a new international tank container train service between Europe and China. During September of that same year, the first electrified cross-border trains were ran between Lithuania and Belarus. On 29 May 2018, the railway companies of the three Baltic states signed an agreement to launch a new intermodal freight service called Amber Train, linking Tallinn and Riga to the Lithuanian-Polish border at Šeštokai where they can be transhipped to the standard gauge network. EU funding was used to support some of these initiatives. During the late 2010s, there was a noticeable uptick in the volume of freight traffic traversing the Lithuanian rail network, along with corresponding increases in revenue.

Between 2018 and 2019, the company's Freight Transport, Passenger Transport and Railway Infrastructure Directorates were reorganized into separate companies, comprising LG CARGO, LG Keleiviams, and Lietuvos geležinkelių infrastruktura. The holding company LTG Group was also established, it remained a state owned enterprise; any excess profits not reinvested into the organisation is paid out to the Lithuanian government. A new group logo, mirroring the colours of the Lithuanian flag and symbolising movement, was also adopted at this time. During late 2020, the reorganisation was hailed for bolstering the competitiveness of Lithuania's railways and maintaining positive growth while also pursuing greater compliance with EU legislation.

One of the more high-profile infrastructure investments being made by LTF Infra in the wider Rail Baltica project, under which a standard gauge high-speed railway will be constructed between the Polish capital of Warsaw and the Estonian capital of Tallinn. The Lithuanian portion of the project involves a 392km line running north-south across the country as well as a new railway node being built in Kaunas to interface with the conventional network. Furthermore, during the late 2010s, a new strategy of widespread railway electrification was announced; specifically, a target for 39% of the Lithuanian rail network being electrified by 2030 was declared, a substantial increase over the 8% that already energised by 2020. Other areas of investment include track doubling, renovated communications, passenger information systems, energy efficiency schemes, routine maintenance, noise reduction, and track renewal programmes. In 2021, investment into key projects was reportedly doubled to €228.9 million, the majority of which was directed to infrastructure-related efforts.

In May 2020, a pilot freight train between Germany and Lithuania was operated under a partnership between LTG Cargo and the German intermodal specialist CargoBeamer. During September of that year, it was announced that LTG Link and the Polish operator PKP Intercity had signed a letter of intent to jointly develop a cross-border intercity passenger service between Vilnius and Warsaw. During March 2021, it was announced that the German specialist IVU Traffic Technologies would supply its digital resource planning and real-time traffic management software to the Lithuanian Railways. That same year, Lithuanian Railways issued multiple tenders calling for the provision of additional electric traction, including hybrid solutions.

During April 2022, LTG Link launched a new ticketing website, displaying more detailed information about services, customer service channels, and travel planning tools; the launch was connected to the introduction of a new smart ticket system that had been promised two years prior. In October 2022, a contract was awarded to ABB to supply 25kV AC electrification apparatus along the 730km line between Vilnius and Klaipeda.

See also

 Rail transport in Lithuania
 Rail Baltica
 Transport in Lithuania
 Vilnius Metro
 Vilnius Intermodal Terminal
 Kaunas Intermodal Terminal

References

External links

Railway companies of Lithuania
Government-owned companies of Lithuania
1860 establishments in the Russian Empire
Companies based in Vilnius
Railway companies established in 1860